The Murphy Maverick is a Canadian two-seat fixed-wing ultralight monoplane designed by Murphy Aircraft of British Columbia. The type is sold as a kit for home construction or as a complete ready-to-fly aircraft.

Development
Designed as a smaller version of the Rebel, the Maverick is an all-metal high-wing braced monoplane with two side-by-side seats and a tailwheel landing gear. The aircraft was designed around the Rotax 503 powerplant, with the goal of producing an economical ultralight trainer. As a homebuilt it can also be fitted with a number of different piston engines including the HKS 700, Rotax 582 and Jabiru 2200.

The aircraft is mainly built from sheet aluminium, with the tail and rear sections of the wings fabric covered to save weight. The wings are constructed using a "D" cell, with stamped ribs and a single wing strut.

The standard landing gear is of a taildragger configuration and bungee suspended, with sprung steel main gear as an option. Additional options include  wing-mounted fuel tanks and fittings for installing floats.

Variants
Phoenix Aircraft Maverick PA
 Licensed built version constructed by Phoenix Aircraft of Munich, Germany for the European market. This version incorporates different seats, plus electric flaps and trim.

Specifications (Murphy Maverick)

References

External links

1990s Canadian civil utility aircraft
Homebuilt aircraft
High-wing aircraft
Single-engined tractor aircraft
Aircraft first flown in 1993
Maverick